The Wheel of Time series, written by Robert Jordan and completed by Brandon Sanderson, is set in an unnamed world that, due to the cyclical nature of time as depicted in the series, is simultaneously the distant past and the distant future Earth. The Randlands or The World of the Wheel are names adopted by fans to refer to the world where The Wheel of Time series takes place. They are derived from the name of the central character, Rand al'Thor, and a section of the companion book The World of Robert Jordan's The Wheel of Time, respectively.

The World of the Wheel

Westlands
The Westlands is one of several names given to the continent or subcontinent that stretches from the Aiel Waste to the Aryth Ocean, and from the Great Blight to the Sea of Storms. It forms the westernmost part of one large landmass that also incorporates the Aiel Waste and the land of Shara, as well as a number of offshore islands belonging to the Sea Folk. The Westlands stretches for roughly 3,500 miles from the Aiel Waste to the Aryth Ocean and is mostly temperate, with hot summers in the southern regions and icy winters in the north. The continent consists of several large plains (notably Almoth Plain, the Plains of Maredo, Caralain Grass, and the Plain of Lances) divided by extensive forests, marshes, and several major mountain ranges, most notably the Mountains of Mist which divide the western coastal regions from the continental interior. The continent is dominated by two extensive river networks. The larger consists of the River Manetherendrelle and its major tributary, the Arinelle. This network rises in the Mountains of Dhoom in the far north and is navigable almost from the Blight to the river mouth at Illian in the far south. The River Erinin flows out the Spine of the World just south of the Niamh Passes westwards, before turning south for 2,000 miles, eventually reaching the sea at Tear. Although not as extensive as the Arinelle-Mantherendrelle network, the Erinin is by far the longer single river and sees much more traffic, as it passes through two of the busiest cities on the continent.

There are currently 14 nations in existence in the Westlands: Altara, Amadicia, Andor, Arad Doman, Arafel, Cairhien, Ghealdan, Illian, Kandor, Murandy, Saldaea, Shienar, Tarabon, and Tear, as well as four major city-states: Falme, Far Madding, Mayene, and Tar Valon. In previous eras, every part of the land was claimed by one nation or another, but in the modern era, there are vast stretches of the continent which are given over to wilderness and are rarely traveled. After the War of the Hundred Years, there were 24 nations in the Westlands. The nations of Almoth, Caralain, Goaban, Hardan, Irenvelle, Kintara, Maredo, Mar Haddon and Mosara all faded away due to lack of population, whereas Malkier was swallowed by the Great Blight.

Aiel Waste
The Aiel Waste is a desert region to the east of the Spine of the World.  The Aiel Waste is so inhospitable that only the hardy Aiel can survive for extended periods there. The Aiel call the Waste the "Three-fold Land," referring to the gifts the harsh land gives to the Aiel people. The gifts to the Aiel are: a shaping stone to make them, a testing ground to prove their worth, and a punishment for their sin. Aiel prophecy states that the Aiel will leave the Waste once the Stone of Tear falls. Trollocs call the Aiel Waste "Djevik K'Shar" in their native tongue, meaning "The Dying Ground." The waste is home to many animal species; some of which are unique to this desert region and all of which seem dangerous to humans in some way. The books have mentioned lions, warthogs, several types of venomous snake, and a type of lizard similar to a gila monster can all be found there. The southern part of the Aiel Waste just north of the Sea of Storms is called the Termool. It is so dry, barren, and desolate that not even the Aiel travel there.

Shara
Shara lies to the east of the Aiel Waste, from which it is separated by the Cliffs of the Dawn and the Great Rift. Significant mountain ranges longer than the Spine of the World lie to the east of both features, further inhibiting travel into Shara. The Cliffs of the Dawn are easily scalable only in six locations. The Sharans have built heavily-fortified towns in each of these locations, where trade is permitted with westerners (Aiel and those gleemen and peddlers from the Westlands the Aiel permitted to cross the Waste). In each of these towns, the residents go veiled at all times, and the walls are so tall that it is impossible to see into the towns from outside. Westerners are not permitted to travel through these towns' eastern gates into Shara proper. Those who try disappear.

South of the cliffs lies the Great Rift, an immense canyon which separates the Sharan interior from the Aiel Waste. The southern edge of the Rift, which may be passable, is separated from the rest of the Aiel Waste by the Termool.

Shara extends much further south than either the Westlands or the Aiel Waste and its southernmost tip crosses the equator. Shara's southwestern coast is extremely mountainous. The only easily-accessible harbors are located along the south coast itself. There are only five known ports on the south coast, and these are similarly classified as open trading ports by the Sharans. Sea Folk and western vessels are permitted to dock, but again, traders are not permitted to travel outside the port cities. The same immense walls are to be found here, but in this case they extend even across the harbors themselves.

Traveling to the east of the easternmost trading port is extremely hazardous and most vessels that attempt going east vanish. Nevertheless, over the centuries, enough Sea Folk vessels have managed to return after conducting inconclusive surveys to put together maps showing the Sharan coast. These maps suggest that Shara extends for approximately 2,000 miles from the Aiel Waste to the Morenal Ocean and for approximately 4,500 miles from the Mountains of Dhoom to the Sea of Storms. The Mountains of Dhoom tumble into the sea similarly to the way they do in the Westlands, and there is at least one large unnamed island off Shara's east coast.

Despite being far more extended than the Westlands, Shara does not seem to be very densely populated, in fact during the Last Battle, the employed Sharan's forces (both armies and channelers) would surely be huge, but not as if this east part of the continent is as populated as the west.

This could be caused simply by being a lesser developed country or maybe it is caused by the presence of some natural obstacle that does not permit the development of a major population. In this second case, it can be guessed that the Cliffs of Dawn, so high, stop wet winds from the Morenal Ocean, provoking aridity in the Aiel Waste but huge rains in Shara, and so the presence of an enormous and almost impenetrable rain forest.

Seanchan
The continent that is home to the Seanchan Empire almost girdles the world from pole to pole and is considerably larger than the continent consisting of the Westlands, Aiel Waste, Great Blight, and Shara. The nearest parts of Seanchan to the Westlands are located more than 5,000 miles across the Aryth Ocean, a journey of some months, even by the fastest ships and contributing to the lack of communication between the two continents for most of recorded history.

Seanchan is split into two landmasses, divided by a long dividing channel. There are four large islands located off the coast of the continent, and three small ones within the dividing channel. The northern landmass is the smaller of the two. The northernmost part of the landmass consists of the Lesser Blight, which is a corrupted landscape similar to the Great Blight north of the Westlands. Considering its latitude, it is possible that this corrupted landscape extends across the entire world, even below the waves. Although the Lesser Blight is not as hostile nor as dangerous as the Great Blight, it is still considered the most dangerous part of the continent.

South of the Lesser Blight are the Mountains of Dhoom. These are considered to be an extension of the mountains of the same name in the Westlands, and it is possible that the mountains completely encircle the Blight and even continue beneath the waves, as they tumble into the sea in the same confused morass of islands and cliffs as in the Westlands.

The Seanchan Empire claims all parts of the continent south of the Mountains of Dhoom. The remainder of the northern landmass consists of three peninsulas which extend for several thousand miles southward from the mountains. These peninsulas are mountainous, with only a few major rivers being marked on maps. The largest cities on the northern landmass are Sohima, Imfaral, Asinbayar and, located at the southernmost tip of the landmass on the equator, Qirat.

The north was secured by the invading armies of Luthair Paendrag Mondwin early during the Conquest, who took Imfaral as their base of operations and first capital before they invaded the south. This suggests their invasion fleet landed on the northeastern coast of the northern landmass. The two subcontinents are divided by a channel or sea. This body of water opens onto the Morenal Ocean at Qirat in the west and proceeds eastwards before turning north for several thousand miles, opening onto the Aryth Ocean at roughly the latitude of the Aile Dashar. A large offshoot of this channel forms a significant bay or gulf between the peninsulas on which Sohima and Imfaral are located. There are three islands in the channel where it swings northwards. The southern landmass is by far the larger of the two. It is located mostly within the southern hemisphere, but a huge peninsula extends north and east for several thousand miles into the northern. The imperial capital of Seandar is located on this landmass, roughly due west of the island of Tremalking. Seandar is located at the meeting point of two substantial river networks.

The southern landmass proper is vast and is covered by mountains several times the length of the Spine of the World, lakes large enough to be called seas, rolling plains, deserts, and immense rivers longer and wider than the Erinin or Manetherendrelle. The other major cities of the Empire located on the southern landmass are Kirendad, Anangore, Shon Kifar, Rampore, Tzura, and Noren M'Shar. Several large islands lie off the coast, one of which is presumably Marendalar, site of the last major rebellion against the Crystal Throne. The island of Maram Kashor lies off the southeastern coast of the southern landmass.

The Land of the Madmen
The Land of the Madmen is the smallest of the known continents. It lies approximately 5,000 miles south of the Westlands, across the Sea of Storms, and 8,000 miles east of Seanchan, across the southern Aryth Ocean. It was discovered some centuries ago by the Sea Folk, who have not attempted to chart the shoreline in detail but have broadly determined its dimensions. According to the Sea Folk, the landmass is approximately 750 leagues (3,000 miles) across and 500 leagues (2,000 miles) north to south. The southern coast is less than 500 miles from the southern icecap. Large numbers of active volcanoes are visible on the coast and the land is constantly seismically active. This also leads to icebergs in the southern seas, as the seismic activity causes chunks of ice to break off from the icecap and drift northwards.

This landmass is believed to have been thrown into chaos by the Breaking of the World, and even after more than 3,500 years, the inhabitants do not seem to have reestablished any kind of order. The people live in hovels in small, primitive villages. Channellers of both sexes exist. The men are frequently insane, and it is hypothesized that the land's ongoing seismic activity may partially be due to the male channellers unleashing the One Power randomly and chaotically (in essence, the Breaking of the World continues on a much smaller scale on this landmass). However, even the females are unpredictable and dangerous. The non-channelling population appears completely untrusting of outsiders, and kill them on sight. After several attempts to establish trade, the Sea Folk have declared this land off-limits, and will not travel there.

All the known information on the Land of the Madmen is given in The World of Robert Jordan's The Wheel of Time. Note that the world map disagrees with the measurements given in the text, indicating dimensions more like 4,500 miles from east to west and 2,500 miles from north to south. If the text is accurate, the landmass would bear intriguing size, location and shape comparisons with Australia. The craziness of the men on the island could be a reference to England sending many of their criminals to Australia in the late-1700s to mid-1800s. Some speculate that the Land of the Madmen is an area the surviving male Aes Sedai fled to, in an attempt to seek refuge from the female Aes Sedai and rebuild. If so the intended effect was not achieved.

The Third Age
The Third Age of the Wheel of Time began with the chaos and destruction of the Breaking of the World that ended the Age of Legends (the Second Age) and ended with the Last Battle, the conclusion of which marked the beginning of the Fourth Age. The Third Age is the Age in which The Wheel of Time novels take place.

The Third Age is sometimes called the Age of Prophecy, as for the entire length of its duration it has been prophesied that the Dragon will be reborn to fight and defeat the Dark One, and the Aes Sedai of the Third Age have attempted to prepare mankind for this prophesied battle.

The Third Age has lasted for almost 3,500 years and has been divided into three lesser eras: After the Breaking (1,350 years), the Free Years (1,135 years) and the New Era (1,000 years). The main sequence novels begin in the year 998 NE.

The Pattern
"The Pattern" is a manifestation of both the physical world and people's destinies, while "the Wheel" represents the passage of time. These concepts apply to a series of parallel worlds, as well. Some characters observe or visit such other worlds; some of these worlds reflect different courses of history, and some are so divergent from the main reality that they are uninhabited. Physics sometimes operates differently in these worlds. The Seanchan imported "exotic" creatures from other worlds, later breeding and training them. Tel'aran'rhiod is the "world of dreams", which connects to all of the other worlds. It can be visited in one's sleep, but events there are real; it is also possible to enter physically. The lives of humans, Ogier, and Shadowspawn and anything else that can affect the Pattern help make the weave of it. Everything is taken into account in the weave, events spanning hundreds if not thousands of years for the proper events to occur. Each Age has a separate pattern that makes the basis for the reality of that Age. This Pattern of the Age, or Age Lace, has been predetermined by the Wheel and it is only able to be partially changed.

Web of Destiny and ta'veren

At the center of every Web of Destiny, or ta'maral'ailen in the Old Tongue, there is a ta'veren. Since ta'veren are made to influence life threads to create change, the only people who can affect the Pattern in any significant ways are ta'veren; hence, the destinies of ta'veren are more strictly controlled by the Wheel of Time itself. These people are used by the Wheel to correct itself when the weave begins to drift from the Pattern. The great changes caused by a ta'veren form a Web of Destiny. These Webs of Destiny are almost always arduous for those that live through that Age, but are an unfortunate necessity for the Wheel. The more change required, the more ta'veren are born.

Influences and present day

Ta'veren appear to affect the Pattern based on their own personalities and skills. Perrin Aybara's ta'veren nature tends strongly to manifest in people, causing people to do or say things they otherwise would not. By contrast, Matrim Cauthon's twisting of the Pattern manifests as a warping of the laws of chance, and tends to be limited to a fairly local area. It most often manifests as extreme good luck for Mat, as well as apparently warning him of important events to come.

By far, the most powerful ta'veren in the present-day world, and possibly the most powerful in history, is Rand al'Thor. His presence in an area causes any number of completely unpredictable and improbable occurrences, from throwing the laws of chance completely askew to two young people who can't stand each other suddenly marrying. This effect is uncontrollable and can extend to cover a wide area, influencing an entire village or a large part of a major city.

In recent times, the three ta'veren have been experiencing momentary disorientation and visions of flashing colors whenever they think of the other ta'veren. These colors are unexplained as yet, but the effect appears to be growing; most recently, the visions have been replaced with actual momentary glimpses of the other ta'veren. It is unknown what these visions are caused by, but it is overwhelmingly likely that it is yet another sign of the impending Last Battle.

Characters

While The Wheel of Time has a total of 2,782 distinct named characters, the books largely follow the same five Emond's Fielders, dubbed by fans the "Emond's Field Five".

 Rand al'Thor: Ta'veren; the main protagonist of the story. The Dragon Reborn, known as the Car'a'carn or He Who Comes with the Dawn to the Aiel, the Coramoor to the Atha'an Miere, and Shadowkiller to the wolves. Born on the slopes of Dragonmount during the Aiel War. The soul of Lews Therin Telamon Kinslayer reborn.
 Matrim Cauthon: Ta'veren; usually called "Mat". He becomes the Marshal General of the Band of the Red Hand, marries the Seanchan Empress Fortuona, and becomes one of the greatest generals the world has ever seen.
 Perrin Aybara: Ta'veren; Perrin is a wolfbrother, and throughout the story becomes quite adept at manipulating Tel'aran'rhiod. Becomes the Lord of the Two Rivers/Steward of the Dragon in the Two Rivers.
 Egwene al'Vere: From Emond's Field herself, she was in training to become a Wisdom before venturing off with Moraine and Lan, where she discovered she could channel. She quickly rises through the ranks of the Aes Sedai, eventually becoming the Amyrlin Seat.
 Nynaeve al'Meara: At the start of the story, she is the Wisdom of Emond's Field. After tracking down the rest of the Emond's Fielders after their departure, she soon finds out she can also channel, eventually becoming an Aes Sedai of the Yellow Ajah, and marries Lan Mandragoran, making her the Queen of Malkier. She is one of the most powerful female channelers alive and a member of the Yellow Ajah, due to her gift with Healing.
 Elayne Trakand: When she first appears, she is the heir to the Lion Throne of Andor, as the only daughter of Queen Morgase Trakand. Later becomes Queen of Andor following her mother's (falsely) presumed death. She is also a powerful channeler, becoming an Aes Sedai of the Green Ajah.
 Moiraine Damodred: Aes Sedai of the Blue Ajah, Moiraine Sedai's arrival to the small village of Emond's Field serves as the inciting incident of the series. Along with her Warder, Lan, Moiraine takes the Emond's Field Five away from their home of the Two Rivers.
 Elmindreda Farshaw: Commonly known as "Min". Originally from Baerlon, Min enters the series because of her unique ability to sometimes see visions and auras around people which can serve as a kind of divination. She is also (arguably) the main love interest of Rand al'Thor
 al'Lan (Lan) Mandragoran: Former Warder to Moiraine Damodred, currently Warder and husband to Nynaeve al'Meara. King of Malkier, which was lost to the Shadow when he was a child. Greatest swordsman of the Third Age, defeated Demandred in single combat by "sheathing the sword".
 Thom Merrilin: Gleeman and adventurer; former bard to Queen Morgase of Andor; also her paramour. Married and Warder to Moiraine Damodred.

Special powers

Channeling 
"Channeling" is equivalent to magic as depicted in other fantasy-genre works, but is never called "magic" in the series. Many characters are channelers, including series protagonists Rand al'Thor, Egwene al'Vere, Nynaeve al'Meara, Elayne Trakand, Moiraine Damodred, and Aviendha. Channelers can access a natural power source called the "One Power", while Shai'tan can grant access to a separate power, the "True Power". Very little is written in the series about the True Power, while the One Power is described extensively. The One Power consists of five elemental "Powers": earth, water, air, fire, and spirit. Channelers often have particular strength in at least one Power, more commonly earth and fire in men and water and air in women; strength in spirit is equally rare between the sexes. A channeler creates a "weave" to achieve a specific effect by placing individual "flows" of the five Powers in a specific geometric configuration. The One Power has two aspects: "saidin", used by men; and "saidar", used by women. They differ sufficiently that no woman can teach a man to channel (and vice versa), and they can be used in drastically incompatible ways, though they sometimes achieve functionally identical effects. The greatest and strongest feats are when both are used together with each other. The True Power similarly differs from both. There are many different limitations of channeling between men and women that often complement each other. Male channelers are usually stronger and women are more dexterous with weaving flows. Women can "link" with other channelers to harness more power; an individual's strength is quantified by the amount of the One Power he or she can channel at once. Men require at least one woman to link with another man, but men are required to increase the maximum number of total linkers. A man will grow in spurts with the end unknown, while women will grow gradually and the final limit is known from the start.

Some men and women are born with the "spark" to channel; these individuals will spontaneously begin to channel around puberty, but without formal training, three of every four will suffer a fatal illness caused by channeling. Those who survive are called "wilders", and often are unaware of the existence or nature of their powers. Channelers are constrained by any restriction they believe applies; wilders often possess a "block" that allows them to channel only under specific circumstances (such as experiencing a particular emotion). The majority of channelers lack the spark and will channel only if taught. Channelers can determine if a person of the same sex has the spark or is capable of learning to channel. A channeler with the spark who receives instruction is not at risk of death and is not normally considered a wilder. Channelers have a longer lifespan than non-channelers, in proportion to their strength; from early adulthood, channelers age more slowly than non-channelers, and the strongest channelers can live over 800 years. Shai'tan tainted saidin at the end of the Age of Legends, causing any male channeler to go insane (usually very destructively) and die; the Breaking was caused by the world's male channelers simultaneously going insane, while in the Third Age, male channelers are neutralized in various ways as they come of age.

Channelers are treated in different ways by different cultures within the series. In the Westlands, channeling is viewed as synonymous with the Aes Sedai, an organization that survived from the Age of Legends and which views channeling as its proprietary domain.  Some Aes Sedai refer to channelers from other traditions as "wilders", even if they are not self-taught. Aes Sedai are respected in most Westland nations, and they rule the city-state of Tar Valon. Aes Sedai are divided into seven "ajahs" named after colors and dedicated to different purposes; Red Ajah members seek out men who can channel and "gentle" them (remove their ability to channel). Also in the Westlands are the Kin, consisting of women who studied in Tar Valon but left without becoming Aes Sedai due to lack of desire or ability to complete their training. The Aes Sedai are aware of the Kin, who are very discreet, but are unaware that the Kin actually outnumber them. Among the Sea Folk, a seafaring Westlands culture, female channelers are expected to become "Windfinders", ship's navigators; the profession is also open to non-channelers. Every generation, the Sea Folk send a few weak channelers to Tar Valon, successfully concealing the prevalence and strength of their channelers. Aiel channelers are expected to become Wise Ones, the culture's spiritual leaders, as are all Dreamwalkers; other worthy women may become Wise Ones without these special powers. Male Aiel channelers go into the Blight, expecting to die after killing some of Shai'tan's creatures; unbeknownst to the Aiel, Shai'tan actually captures and corrupts these men. Shara is secretly ruled by its female channelers, the Ayyad, through figurehead monarchs; the Ayyad keep their male offspring as breeding stock before killing them. The Seanchan believe channelers are subhuman and dangerous; they enslave female channelers with the spark, while those capable of acting as their handlers are, unbeknownst to themselves and other Seanchan, those who can learn to channel. Male channelers are executed.

Certain "objects of the One Power" exist. "Angreal" and "sa'angreal" increase the amount of the One Power a channeler can harness; sa'angreal may be orders of magnitude more powerful than angreal. "Ter'angreal" produce specific effects; some require channeling to function, while others operate continuously or via touch; some affect only channelers or affect them differently.

Talents 
Robert Jordan uses the capitalized word "Talent" to refer to two distinct types of abilities sometimes possessed by channelers; the text also sometimes uses "Talent" to refer to abilities unrelated to the One Power and possessed by non-channelers.

One type of Talent is the aptitude for a particular weave or type of weave. Talents seen in the series include Healing (Nynaeve al'Meara), manipulating weather (many Windfinders), creating "gateways" for instantaneous travel (Androl Genhald), and fabricating the indestructible substance "cuendillar" (Egwene al'Vere). Such a Talent may manifest as finer control over weaves, the ability to use a weave that would otherwise be beyond the channeler's strength, superior results when using a weave with all other factors equal, or some combination of these benefits. Some weaves, such as creating cuendillar, function only for a channeler with a corresponding Talent.

A Talent can also be some other ability possessed only by some channelers, but distinct from creating weaves of the One Power. Talents of this type include creating ter'angreal (Elayne Trakand), perceiving the purpose or function of a ter'angreal (Aviendha), analyzing an expended weave, "unweaving" a weave (Aviendha), predicting the weather (Nynaeve al'Meara), recognizing ta'veren on sight (Siuan Sanche and Logain Ablar), and "Foretelling" prophecy (Elaida do Avriny a'Roihan).  The latter three Talents have no obvious connection to the One Power, but are described as occurring only in channelers.

Other abilities 
Some abilities depicted in The Wheel of Time are not related to the One Power or the ability to channel.

"Dreaming" (an Aes Sedai term) is the ability to have prophetic dreams, which are usually symbolic rather than literal. "Dreamwalking" (an Aiel term) is a set of abilities involving dreaming, including the ability to visit Tel'aran'rhiod and the dreams of others at will, and aptitude for manipulating Tel'aran'rhiod.  Egwene al'Vere is both a Dreamer and Dreamwalker, and the text never establishes whether or not these are two separate things. Dreamwalking is well known to the Aiel Wise Ones, who use it for society-wide communication; Aiel Dreamwalkers include channelers, Amys and Melaine, and the non-channeler, Bair, who become Egwene's teachers, as the last Aes Sedai Dreamer died about 500 years earlier.  No man is explicitly identified as a Dreamwalker in the series, but many of the male and female Forsaken, Shai'tan's top lieutenants, appear in Tel'aran'rhiod, and the male Forsaken Ishamael projects himself into other characters' dreams.

"Ta'veren" are individuals who are focal points of the Pattern for a time.  Rand al'Thor, Matrim Cauthon, and Perrin Aybara are all ta'veren during the events of the series. The Pattern causes events and the actions of others surrounding a ta'veren to conform to the ta'veren's destiny, usually resulting in occurrences that are possible but unlikely.  Mat has exceptionally good luck at gambling and in battle, while Perrin easily earns the support of others.  Rand's presence often affects a large area around himself, causing such anomalies as one entire village pairing off in marriage in one day, another village erupting into violence over every disagreement its residents ever had, and a city's newborns being free of birth defects during Rand's residency.

Rand al'Thor is also the "Dragon Reborn," a prophesied savior. Towards the end of the series, Rand is shown to have reality warping abilities related to the Dragon Reborn's connection to the Pattern; he kindles a pipe without channeling.

Perrin Aybara and Elyas Machera are "Wolfbrothers," individuals who can communicate telepathically with wolves, which are depicted as sapient.  Wolfbrothers also have abilities similar to Dreaming and Dreamwalking, although they are not shown as capable of entering the dreams of others. The souls of wolves inhabit Tel'aran'rhiod, which they call the "wolf dream," and a Wolfbrother who loses his identity as a man may become a wolf there.  Only male Wolfbrothers are depicted in the series.

Min Farshaw sees auras and images around people; she does not always understand these visions, but sometimes she instinctively understands them and is always correct in such cases.  Min is the only person in the series depicted as having this ability.  However, the superstitious Seanchan are apparently familiar with it and consider the images to be omens; when Empress Fortuona learns that Min possesses this ability, she identifies Min as a "Doomseer" and immediately makes her a top advisor.

Hurin is a "sniffer," one who can detect violence as an unpleasant odor.  This ability is apparently accepted by his countrymen; it is considered an asset for his career in law enforcement, and Perrin pretends to be a sniffer to conceal that the true source of his insight is communication with wolves.

The Seanchan produce ter'angreal rings that, when touched with the wearer's blood, grant him or her the abilities of a "Bloodknife":  increased strength and speed and the ability to blend into shadows, at the cost of dying within a matter of days or weeks.

The books describe several scenarios where Shai'tan gives powers to individuals.  People whose souls are removed by Shai'tan become supernaturally inconspicuous "Gray Men," ideal assassins.  Padan Fain serves Shai'tan and is given the ability to track Rand al'Thor. Padan Fain later merges with the ghost of the evil Mordeth, gaining the abilities to induce paranoia in others and to summon and control a deadly miasma.  Shai'tan merges the bodies and souls of Isam Mandragoran and Luc Mantear into the individual known as Slayer, to whom Shai'tan grants powers involving Tel'aran'rhiod, including the ability to travel instantaneously between there and the physical world while awake and without the use of a gateway.

Encyclopedic works
Tor Books published a companion book to the series, entitled The World of Robert Jordan's The Wheel of Time, in November 1997, which contains much hitherto unrevealed background information about the series including the first maps of the entire world and the Seanchan home continent. Jordan co-authored the book with Teresa Patterson, who has also co-authored a similar companion book with Terry Brooks, The World of Shannara. Jordan ruled the book broadly canonical but stated that it was written from the perspective of a historian within The Wheel of Time universe and was prone to errors of bias and guesswork.

On November 3, 2015, The Wheel of Time Companion: The People, Places, and History of the Bestselling Series was released in hardback format, written by Harriet McDougal, Alan Romanczuk, and Maria Simons from Tor Books. Alan Romanczuk and Maria Simons were Robert Jordan's editorial assistants. The book is an encapsulating glossary of the entire series. The authors began compiling material for the volume as early as 2005, and the final book was released after the series' conclusion.

References

Fantasy worlds
Fictional planets
Fictional universes
Fantasy literature